Kathleen Riebe is an American politician from Salt Lake City, Utah. She was a member of the Utah State Board of Education through 2018, and now represents Utah's 15th senate district in the Utah State Senate. Prior to redistricting she represented the 8th district.

Education and career
In 1991, Riebe graduated from Hofstra University with a double major in Elementary Education and Sociology.
She has worked as a truck driver, bartender, and an Alta police dispatcher and has taught outdoor education in New York, Georgia, New Jersey, and Maine.  
Riebe has taught in the Granite School District since 2001, where she is currently employed as an educational technology specialist. She got a Master's and an Administrative Certificate in 2006 from Utah State University. She has an Educational Technology Endorsement from Southern Utah University. She has 2 children.

Political career
In 2016, Riebe was elected to the Utah State Board of Education, defeating anti-common-core candidate Gary Thompson. While on the State school board, she served on the board's Financial Literacy Committee; School and Institutional Trust Lands Administration (STILA) Nominating Committee; Science, Technology, Engineering, and Mathematics (STEM) Action Center; Underage Drinking Committee; and served as Co-Chair of the Finance Committee. She took part in settlement negotiations when the Utah School Board was sued over the Professional Practices Advisory Commission, or UPPAC, for recommending harsher-than-necessary and often inconsistent discipline.

Riebe secured the Democratic nomination for Utah Senate District 8 by defeating former candidate for U. S. Congress Kathie Allen at the Salt Lake County Democratic Convention on April 14, 2018, with 65% of the vote.

On November 6, 2018, Riebe won the 2018 election for Utah Senate District 8, defeating incumbent Republican Brian Zehnder with 56% of the vote. Having been elected to the State Senate, she had to resign her State School Board seat mid-term.
Riebe sits on the Senate Education and Transportation Committees.

After redistricting in 2022, Senator Riebe’s district changed to the 15th District. She was elected Minority Whip in January 2023.

External links
Campaign website
Utah State Legislature website

References

Living people
21st-century American politicians
Politicians from Salt Lake City
Utah State University alumni
Hofstra University alumni
Democratic Party Utah state senators
Year of birth missing (living people)
21st-century American women politicians
Women state legislators in Utah